Heliocidaris is a genus of sea urchins, part of the familia Echinometridae.

Characteristics 
This genus is typical of west Pacific Ocean (Japan to New Zealand), in particular in Australia. Some species are edible.

List of species 
This genus contains 6 extant species and 1 fossil :
Heliocidaris australiae (A. Agassiz, 1872)
Heliocidaris bajulus (Dartnall, 1972)
Heliocidaris crassispina (A. Agassiz, 1863)
Heliocidaris erythrogramma (Valenciennes, 1846)
Heliocidaris ludbrookae Philip, 1965 †
Heliocidaris robertsi Lindley, 2004
Heliocidaris tuberculata (Lamarck, 1816)

References

Echinometridae